Cedarville Township is one of the twelve townships of Greene County, Ohio, United States. As of the 2010 census the township population was 5,500, of whom 1,481 lived in the unincorporated portions.

Geography
Located in the northeastern part of the county, it borders the following townships:
Green Township, Clark County - north
Madison Township, Clark County - northeast
Ross Township - east
New Jasper Township - south
Xenia Township - southwest
Miami Township - northwest

The village of Cedarville is located in central Cedarville Township.

Name and history
Cedarville Township was established in 1850 from land given by Xenia, Miami, and Ross townships.

It is the only Cedarville Township statewide.

Government
The township is governed by a three-member board of trustees, who are elected in November of odd-numbered years to a four-year term beginning on the following January 1. Two are elected in the year after the presidential election and one is elected in the year before it. There is also an elected township fiscal officer, who serves a four-year term beginning on April 1 of the year after the election, which is held in November of the year before the presidential election. Vacancies in the fiscal officership or on the board of trustees are filled by the remaining trustees.

The township trustees meet in the Cedarville Opera House in Cedarville, which serves as the township hall.

References

External links
County website

Townships in Greene County, Ohio
1850 establishments in Ohio
Populated places established in 1850
Townships in Ohio